Sympleurotis rudis is a species of beetle in the family Cerambycidae. It was described by Bates in 1881. Costa Rica, Honduras, Guatemala, Mexico, and Panama.

References

Colobotheini
Beetles described in 1881